USS Philippi was a blockade runner captured by the Union Navy during the American Civil War.  She served the Union Navy’s struggle against the Confederate States of America as a picket, patrol and dispatch vessel.

Service history 

Union steamer  discovered new and fast sidewheeler Ella 10 November 1863 steaming along the coast north of Fort Fisher, North Carolina. She immediately gave chase and fired a shot at the blockade runner which glanced off Ella’s gallows frame and caused her to surrender. The Boston, Massachusetts, Prize Court subsequently condemned the prize and sold her to the Navy 23 February 1864. Renamed Philippi four days later, the steamer commissioned early in April. Philippi was ordered to New Orleans, Louisiana, on the 11th for duty in the West Gulf Blockading Squadron, Philippi served the squadron as a picket, patrol, and dispatch vessel until set afire by Confederate artillery and destroyed while following Admiral David Farragut’s fleet into Mobile Bay 5 August 1864.

See also

Blockade runners of the American Civil War

References 

Ships of the Union Navy
Steamships of the United States Navy
Gunboats of the United States Navy
Dispatch boats of the United States Navy
American Civil War patrol vessels of the United States
Shipwrecks of the American Civil War
Shipwrecks of the Alabama coast
Maritime incidents in August 1864